East Lynne is a 1913 British silent drama film directed by Bert Haldane and starring Blanche Forsythe, Fred Paul and Fred Morgan. It is based on the 1861 novel East Lynne by Ellen Wood.

Cast
 Blanche Forsythe - Lady Isobel 
 Fred Paul - Archibald Carlyle 
 Fred Morgan - Captain Levison 
 Rachel de Solla - Cornelia Carlyle 
 May Morton - Joyce 
 Pippin - Little Willie 
 Doreen O'Connor - Afy Hallijohn
 Lindsay Fincham - Barbara Hare
 Rolf Leslie   
 Roy Travers

References

External links
 

1913 films
1910s historical adventure films
British historical adventure films
British adventure drama films
1910s English-language films
Films directed by Bert Haldane
Films based on British novels
Films set in England
Films set in the 19th century
British silent feature films
British black-and-white films
1910s adventure drama films
1910s historical drama films
British historical drama films
1913 drama films
1910s British films
Silent adventure drama films
Silent historical adventure films
Silent historical drama films